Bernardo Méndez de Figueroa (1782 – May 1839) nicknamed "El Pavo" was a Nicaraguan military figure most notable for reestablishing military absolutism in Nicaragua in 1837 during the presidency of José Núñez.

He fell from power in April 1839 after he lost the Battle of Espíritu Santo and his position was taken by Casto Fonseca, who ruled until his death in 1845, and was replaced by José Trinidad Muñoz. Nicaragua would be run militarily for 18 years until Muñoz' death during the Filibuster War.

Assassination of Jose Zepeda 

On 25 January 1837 Méndez and Fonseca took the León barracks and a man named Braulio Mendiola out of jail. They instructed him to arrest the Head of State, José Zepeda, Colonel Román Valladares, Deputy Pascual Rivas and Captain Evaristo Berríos.

Zepeda and Colonel Balladares were killed and later buried in the Cemetery of Guadalupe. Deputy Head of State, José Núñez, assumed leadershipto finish Zepeda's term, which had two years left. Núñez did not arrest the rebels, but rather appeased Méndez and on 26 January appointed him General Commander of Arms, but Braulio Mendiola was executed.

War with El Salvador 

After the breaking of the Federal Pact in 1838, Honduras and Nicaragua declared war on El Salvador, where the federal government was located. In January 1839 Méndez, commanding a small Nicaraguan army, seized San Miguel and began marching towards San Salvador, achieving victory in Llanos del Jicaral, occupying San Vicente and advancing on Cojutepeque.

Imprisonment and Death 
The Salvadoran army under the command of Francisco Morazán defeated the Nicaraguan army at the hacienda Espíritu Santo on 6 April 1839, returning Méndez to León where he was removed from office, replaced by Casto Fonseca, and imprisoned in San Juan del Norte under the responsibility of the Political Chief of Granada, Narciso Espinosa. Espinosa released Méndez and allowed him to live in a private house where he died shortly after, possibly in May 1839.

References 

Nicaraguan military personnel
19th-century Nicaraguan people